Alexander Serhiyovych Symonenko (born 14 February 1974) is a Ukrainian former track cyclist. Symonenko was the world champion in individual pursuit in 2001, as well as the world champion in team pursuit as part of the Ukraine team in 1998 and 2001. In the 2000 Summer Olympics, he won a silver medal in the team pursuit as part of the Ukraine team. Symonenko was born in Kirovohrad (present day Kropyvnytskyi).

Results

References

1974 births
Living people
Cyclists at the 1996 Summer Olympics
Cyclists at the 2000 Summer Olympics
Olympic cyclists of Ukraine
Olympic silver medalists for Ukraine
UCI Track Cycling World Champions (men)
Ukrainian male cyclists
Olympic medalists in cycling
Sportspeople from Kropyvnytskyi
Medalists at the 2000 Summer Olympics
Ukrainian track cyclists